Byron Keith Williams (born October 31, 1960) is a former professional American football wide receiver. He was drafted by the Green Bay Packers in the tenth round of the 1983 NFL Draft. He played college football at UT Arlington.

Williams has also been a member of the Philadelphia Eagles, New York Giants, Indianapolis Colts, B.C. Lions, Ottawa Rough Riders,  Detroit Lions, Orlando Thunder, Saskatchewan Roughriders and New York/New Jersey Knights Baltimore Stallions.

Professional career

Philadelphia Eagles
Williams was signed by the Philadelphia Eagles on September 13, 1983.

New York Giants
Williams was signed by the New York Giants on October 27, 1983.

References

1960 births
Living people
People from Texarkana, Texas
American football wide receivers
Canadian football wide receivers
Texas–Arlington Mavericks football players
New York Giants players
Orlando Thunder players
Saskatchewan Roughriders players
New York/New Jersey Knights players